Deer Creek Township is one of fourteen townships in Cass County, Indiana. As of the 2010 census, its population was 912.

History
Deer Creek Township was organized in 1842. Deer Creek Township was named from Deer Creek, which was named from herds of wild deer that were often seen near its banks.

Geography

Unincorporated towns
 Deacon
 Young America

Adjacent townships
 Washington (north)
 Tipton (northeast)
 Jackson (east)
 Ervin Township, Howard County (south)
 Carrollton Township, Carroll County (southwest)
 Washington Township, Carroll County (northwest)

Major highways
  Indiana State Road 18

Cemeteries
The township contains three cemeteries: Harness, Hoover-Snider and Miller.

References
 
 United States Census Bureau cartographic boundary files

External links

 Indiana Township Association
 United Township Association of Indiana

Townships in Cass County, Indiana
Townships in Indiana
1842 establishments in Indiana
Populated places established in 1842